Eoghan Karl Christopher Quigg (born 12 July 1992) is a footballer and pop singer from Dungiven, Northern Ireland, who finished third in the fifth series of the British television music talent contest The X Factor in 2008.

As a result of his X Factor success, Quigg was due to be signed by Simon Cowell, X Factor creator/producer and owner and CEO of Syco Records, but was instead signed to RCA after Cowell pulled out. Quigg released an eponymous studio album in 2009, to strongly negative reviews. Quigg competed in the Irish national selection for the chance to represent Ireland in 2014 at the Eurovision Song Contest but finished second.

Quigg joined Coagh United F.C. in 2015, and later Portstewart F.C. in the Northern Ireland Intermediate League.

Early life
Eoghan Karl Christopher Quigg grew up in Dungiven, County Londonderry, Northern Ireland. Singing along to Disney cartoons since the age of two, Quigg found his voice when he was in class and told to stand up and sing as a punishment. To the teacher's surprise he sang well, which led to his becoming a choir boy. From then on he sang lead roles in school musicals, such as Joseph and the Amazing Technicolor Dreamcoat.

Career

Singing career

2007–2008: The X Factor
In 2008, Quigg auditioned for the talent show The X Factor in front of judges Simon Cowell, Dannii Minogue, Louis Walsh and Cheryl Cole. Quigg got past the "judges' houses" stage of the competition, and made it to the live shows in Cowell's 14–24 boys group, along with Scott Bruton and Austin Drage, both of whom were eliminated early in the live shows. On the first live show, Quigg sang "Imagine" and was highly praised by the judges. On the second live show (Michael Jackson week) he sang "Ben" which was also praised. On Big Band week Quigg sang "L-O-V-E" and received a standing ovation from the judges and the crowd. He made it to the semi-finals and after performances of "Year 3000" and "Does Your Mother Know" was voted through to the final.

Quigg eventually finished third, with Alexandra Burke the winner, and JLS runners-up.

Performances on The X Factor

2008–09: Post X Factor
Quigg appeared at the Cheerios Childline Concert at the Dublin O2 in Dublin on 16 December 2008, among acts including Enrique Iglesias, Anastacia and Irish boy band Boyzone. In December he also appeared on The Late Late Show where it was announced that Boyzone had invited him on their UK and Ireland Better Tour.  On 15 January 2009 it was announced that Quigg had landed a record deal with Syco's parent company Sony BMG. He later signed to RCA Records.

2009: Studio album

Quigg released his only album, titled Eoghan Quigg, on 6 April 2009. "28,000 Friends", its sole single, peaked at no. 96 in the UK Singles Chart. The album charted at number 14 and spent 3 weeks in the top 100. It debuted at Number 1 on the Irish Albums Chart, and left the charts eight weeks later. The album met with what Matthew McCreary in The Independent described as a critical "savaging". Many reviewers, including Peter Robinson of The Guardian, called it the worst record ever made. Criticism was directed at its lack of original material, low production values and poor singing performance from Quigg. Following disappointing album sales, Quigg was dropped by RCA Records.

2014: Eurovision Song Contest
In February 2014, Quigg was announced by RTÉ as one of the five acts that would compete to represent Ireland in the Eurovision Song Contest 2014, with the song "The Movie Song". He finished second in the contest.

Television
Quigg played a minor role in the BBC sitcom Dani's House, playing himself. He appeared as a guest on 22 December 2009 edition of Alan Carr: Chatty Man and featured as a guest on Harry Hill's TV Burp on 19 February 2011.

Radio
In April 2017, Quigg began presenting on Q Radio Mid Ulster. The following year, he interviewed his fellow 2008 X Factor finalist, Alexandra Burke.

Football career
He began an amateur football career in 2015, signing for Coagh United F.C.. He later joined Portstewart F.C. in the Northern Ireland Intermediate League.

Personal life
Quigg lives in Derry with his girlfriend Amy Campbell, whom he began dating in 2015. They have a daughter, Emmy Belle, who was born in April 2021. Quigg also plays an active part in the lives of Cooper and Milla, Campbell's two children from a previous relationship. In October 2022, the couple announced that they were expecting their second child (and Campbell's fourth overall).

He had a hair transplant in 2020, travelling to Turkey to get the procedure done.

Quigg has maintained his singing career as a member of a wedding band called The Housem8s.

Discography

Albums

Singles

As lead artist

As featured artist

References

1992 births
Living people
Male singers from Northern Ireland
The X Factor (British TV series) contestants
People from Dungiven
Musicians from County Londonderry